Graham Westbrook Rowley  (October 31, 1912 – December 31, 2003) was an Arctic explorer, hailed as "one of the last true explorers of North America" (The Telegraph).

Early life and family 
Rowley was born on October 31, 1912, in Manchester, England.

As the youngest of four, Rowley always had a playful, ambitious edge; which only helped his future highly demanding career.

He met his wife Diana at the Royal Geographical Society in Cambridge, where she was a student editor, and after many failed accounts on asking her to go out on a date with him, she finally gave in and they were inseparable from that day forth.

They married twice, once in 1944 (a civil wedding before he left for the army) and again in 1945 in a Church setting.

Together they had three healthy daughters: Anne, Sue (Susan) and Jane.

Rowley and Diana were married for 69 years, and shared their passions for the Arctic together.

Education 
He attended Clare College, Cambridge, and received his B.A. from the University of Cambridge in 1934 and his M.A. from the same institution in 1936.

From 1936 to 1939, Rowley engaged in an archaeological excavation in the Eastern Canadian Arctic. During this time, he discovered new islands in Fox Basin, carried out the original exploration of the Baffin Island coast, crossed Baffin Island by a new route, and excavated the first major site in Dorset culture. Because of his work with the Inuit and Dorset peoples, Rowley had a large island and river in the Arctic named after him.

He served in the Canadian Army in World War II and received the Member of the Order of the British Empire in 1945.

A Fellow of the Royal Canadian Geographical Society, Rowley was awarded the Society's prestigious Massey Medal in 1963 for his geographical work.

As a scientist with the Department of Indian Affairs and Northern Development in the early 1970s, he created a training program for Northern scientists and developed ground and air support services for scientific groups working in the Arctic.

He was made an honorary member of the American Polar Society in 1985, due to his countless advancements and discoveries in the field.

He died in Ottawa, Ontario, Canada on December 31, 2003, surrounded by his wife, daughters and grandchildren.

Publications
 Cold Comfort: My  Love  Affair  with the Arctic (1996)

See also

 John Winter Crowfoot

References

Royal Canadian Geographical Society fellows
American Polar Society honorary members
Massey Medal recipients
Members of the Order of the British Empire
Members of the Order of Canada
1912 births
2003 deaths
Alumni of the University of Cambridge